Dendropsophus limai is a species of frog in the family Hylidae.
It is endemic to Brazil.
Its natural habitats are subtropical or tropical moist lowland forests, freshwater marshes, and intermittent freshwater marshes.

References

Sources

limai
Endemic fauna of Brazil
Amphibians described in 1962
Taxonomy articles created by Polbot